Antonio Semini (c. 1485 – after 1547) was an Italian painter of the late-Renaissance, active in his native Genoa.

He was born and trained in Genoa and died in Milan. He was the pupil of Ludovico Brea, and painted in collaboration with Teramo Piaggio. Antonio painted a Nativity for S. Domenico, Savona. Among his pupils were his sons Andrea and Ottavio Semini.

Notes

References

1485 births
1540s deaths
15th-century Italian painters
Italian male painters
16th-century Italian painters
Painters from Genoa
Italian Mannerist painters